Addis Hintsa (born 30 July 1987  in Bishoftu) Oromia state is an Ethiopian footballer. He currently plays for Sudan Premier League side Al-Ahly Shendi.

Career

In 2012 has been a golden year for Dedebit midfielder. He has proved his quality by dominating the midfield in most of the matches in EPL. The former striker is a brilliant player, a physical beast with good technical quality, he is a tough tackler but at the same time he can stride forward and play the ball. Addis is relatively a complete central midfielder, can tackle, defend, and is good in the air. That's why he was awarded Player of the season award in 2011/12 by Passion Sport magazine award./ As of 2021, Addis plays for Hadiya Hossana FC.

International career

He is part of the Ethiopia national football team since 2012.
He was a key player in the 2013 Africa Cup of Nations. On the final match in 2013 Africa Cup of Nations Group C against Nigeria,  his goalie Sisay Bancha was sent off and he is responsible to take the goalkeeper's role as all of their substitutions were already used. However, he  missed by inches to save Victor Moses's penalty kick as they lost 0-2 to Nigeria both by Moses' penalty kicks.

References

External links
 

1987 births
Living people
Ethiopia international footballers
2013 Africa Cup of Nations players
Ethiopian footballers
Ethiopian expatriate footballers
Expatriate footballers in Sudan
Al-Ahly Shendi players
Sportspeople from Oromia Region
Association football midfielders
Hadiya Hossana F.C. players